Amegilla niveocincta, is a species of bee belonging to the family Apidae subfamily Apinae.

References

External links
 AnimalDiversity.org - Amegilla_niveocincta
 An updated checklist of bees of Sri Lanka with new records

Apinae
Insects of Sri Lanka
Insects described in 1854